Beledweyne Airport or Ugas Khalif International Airport  is an airport serving Beledweyne (also spelled Belet Uen or Beletweyn), the capital city of the Hiran region in Somalia.

Facilities

As of February 2015, the Djibouti Defense Forces had refurbished the airstrip. The Beledweyne municipality launched a project to further develop the airport in May of that year.

Demographics/population
The broader Beledweyne district has total population of 2 million residents, with the Hawadle subclan of Hawiye well represented making up 75% of the city's population.

The airport was named after the well known Ugas Khalif who was the Ugas of Xawaadle clan, which is considered to be the major and dominant clan of the Hiiraan region, predominantly Baledwayne.

Climate
Beledweyne has a hot desert climate (Köppen climate classification BWh).

References

External links
 OpenStreetMap - Belet Uen Airport
 OurAirports - Beletwene Airport
 Aeronautical chart at SkyVector
 

Airports in Somalia
Hiran, Somalia
Airport